Charles Leonard Moore (March 16, 1854 –1925) was an American poet and essayist, born in Philadelphia.  He became a lawyer and in 1878–79 served as United States Consul at San Antonio, Brazil.  Besides contributing critically to the Chicago Dial, he published:  
 Atlas (1881)
 Poems Antique and Modern (1883)
 Book of Day Dreams (1883)
 Banquet of Palacios (1889), a comedy
 Odes (1896)
 The Ghost of Rosalys (1900), a political drama
 The Red Branch Cresta - A Trilogy (1904)

Sources

External links
 
  List of Moore's works

References

American male poets
Writers from Philadelphia
1854 births
1925 deaths
19th-century American lawyers